Benjamin James Clyde (born June 10, 1951) is a retired American basketball player. Born in Albany, Georgia, he played for Florida State University. He was selected by the Boston Celtics in the 5th round (89th pick overall) of the 1974 NBA Draft, then played for the Celtics (1974–75) in the NBA for 25 games.

Sportswriter Vince Murray called Clyde "the best high school basketball player [he had] ever seen", and Barry McDermott of Sports Illustrated described Clyde as "a superior individual basketball talent", but Clyde's career suffered due to his repeated conflicts with other players and coaches.

Career
In 1971, while he attended Ellsworth Community College, Clyde was voted Most Valuable Player of the year by the National Junior College Athletic Association. He later transferred to Florida State University, where he played well but clashed with his coaches. After Clyde was suspended for punching an opposing player during one game, Coach Hugh Durham described him as "thinking about himself and the hell with Florida State".

On the Celtics, Clyde played frequently in the early part of the 1974–75 season, while Don Nelson was injured. However, after Nelson's recovery, Clyde was given less playing time. Ultimately, he refused to go into a game after being tapped to play a "clean-up operation" in the last two minutes. After this incident, Clyde was benched for the remainder of the season, and turned down a contract to play with the Celtics for another season.

Personal life
Clyde is one of eight siblings in his family. He was raised by a single mother, as his father left the family early in Clyde's life. He was also supported by Rubye Wysinger, one of his high school teachers, who has been described as a "pillar of support" for Clyde and as "one of [his] most trusted advisors".

Clyde was expelled from high school after an incident in which he allegedly extorted money from another student; however, he was later readmitted to the school.

External links

References

1951 births
Living people
Basketball players from Georgia (U.S. state)
Boston Celtics draft picks
Boston Celtics players
Florida State Seminoles men's basketball players
Junior college men's basketball players in the United States
Small forwards
Sportspeople from Albany, Georgia
American men's basketball players